Sarah Coysh (c. 1742 – 1801) was the heiress to the estates of the Coysh, Allen, and James families. Her marriage to John Rolls (1735–1801) illustrates one of the methods by which the renowned Rolls family of Monmouthshire, Wales, and London, England, accumulated and improved their properties and advanced their social rank during the eighteenth and nineteenth centuries. 

By 1830, her son John Rolls of The Hendre in Llangattock-Vibon-Avel, Monmouthshire, near Monmouth, had made the estate his country seat and undertaken the first of several expansions of the mansion. By 1892, two expansions later, his grandson John A Rolls had been elevated to the peerage and had become Baron Llangattock of The Hendre. At the turn of the twentieth century, following the mansion's fourth enlargement, the family was honoured with a visit from the future King George V and Queen Mary, then the Duke and Duchess of York. The royal visit included a ride in the automobile of Lord Llangattock's son Charles Stewart Rolls, future aviation pioneer and co-founder of Rolls-Royce.

References

External links 
 St Mary Aldermary, City of London
 St Michael, Highgate
 Southwark Cathedral
 St Giles, Camberwell
 St Mary Magdalen, Bermondsey
 St Mary's Priory Church, Monmouth
 Essays on 18th-century cowkeepers

1740s births
1801 deaths
History of Monmouthshire
Year of birth uncertain
18th-century English women
18th-century English people
Rolls family